The men's 100 metre backstroke competition of the swimming events at the 1971 Pan American Games took place on 6 August.  The last Pan American Games champion was José Fiolo of Brazil.

This race consisted of two lengths of the pool, both lengths being in breaststroke.

Results
All times are in minutes and seconds.

Heats

Final 
The final was held on August 6.

References

Swimming at the 1971 Pan American Games